The 2004 South American Swimming Championships were swum March 25-28 in Maldonado, Uruguay. The championships featured competition in 40 long course (50m) events.

Participating nations
As an event organized by CONSANAT, the confederation that oversees Aquatics in South America, the meet featured its members, including: Argentina, Bolivia, Brazil, Chile, Colombia, Ecuador, Paraguay, Peru, Suriname, Uruguay and Venezuela.

Results

Men

Women

References

2004 in water sports
2004 in swimming
Swimming competitions in South America
2004 in South American sport